Mary Ormond or Ormand (born c. 1702, died c. 1759) was the wife of the notorious English pirate Blackbeard.

She was notable for her marriage to Edward Teach, better known as Blackbeard.  She was married by Royal Governor Charles Eden in Bath, North Carolina, at about the age of sixteen years.  The wedding was attended by Tobias Knight, the Royal Secretary for North Carolina, who was Teach's neighbor.  She was the daughter of William Ormand, a plantation owner from Bath in Somerset. It is believed Blackbeard offered her as a gift to the crew of his ship Queen Anne's Revenge, although her ultimate fate is undocumented.

References
Professor Robert . Lee. Blackbeard the Pirate. 264 pages. John F. Blair, 1974. . (Not the general with the same name.)

1702 births
Year of death unknown
People from Bath, Somerset
People of colonial North Carolina